The Buttermarket Centre is a four-level, £65 million shopping centre located in the centre of Ipswich, Suffolk, England. The centre was opened on 1 October 1992, comprising  over four levels. There is also a 430-space underground car park covering two levels under the shopping centre. There is also access from the car park to the shopping centre via lifts and stairs. The anchor stores (upon opening) were Owen Owen and C&A, however TK Maxx is now the anchor store comprising  of floor space. The shopping has 32 retail units including Boots, Starbucks and Julian Graves.

Recent Investment
In 2012 the national cinema chain, Vue Cinemas, was granted permission by Ipswich Borough Council to convert the 2 storey shopping centre into a cinema. Their vision for the conversion was to convert the ground floor into a 9 screen cinema with retail outlets on the upper floor. However, in February 2015, Vue Cinemas withdrew plans but did not give an answer to why.

In March 2015 the centre was bought by Capital & Regional and Drum Property Group for £9.2 million. The group venture, called Buttermarket Ipswich Ltd, saw the creation of a new Empire Cinemas 12 screen complex, and dining/leisure units, which opened on 31st March 2017.

References

Buildings and structures in Ipswich
1992 establishments in England